By the Rapids is Mohawk-language animated television show that originally aired on the Aboriginal Peoples Television Network (APTN) from 2008 to 2012. It was the first Indigenous animated television series in Canada.

The series centers on Cory Littlehorn, a teenager whose family moves from the urban setting of Toronto to the small Native community where his parents grew up and the humor of day-to-day life in a small town. It was created by Joseph Lazare who drew from his experience of moving when he was a teenager from Kahnawake, a Mohawk reserve outside of Montreal, to Toronto. Lazare has stated that it was his intent to create a show that "was special to our community but wasn't neglecting people from the outside." Additionally, he wanted to show that his culture was filled with a variety of types of people with different lifestyles.

Characters
Joseph Lazare:
Cory
Regis, Cory's uncle
Kim
Ado Darho

Kaniehtiio Horn:
Karen, Cory's cousin
Oneida

Others:
Waneek Horn Miller
A1T2

Mighty 5 Nations (M5N):
Mohawk, guy who curls a dumbbell. His totem is Eagle.
Oneida, girl with brown hair, 3 feathers, no purple shawl, heels
Onondaga, guy
Seneca, girl with black hair, 1 feather, glasses, purple headband, shoots arrows. She initiates Super Mighty Warrior.
Kayuga, guy
Tuscarora the uncounted towel boy with glasses, Sene is afraid he will be hurt. His totem is Rock which he can become as the SMW head. Becomes dispatcher after secretly helping.

Injusticers:
Ado Darho
Father Fauhder
Bucky, the most evil buck tooth beaver. He gets enlarged.
Queen Vexin, commands army of robot bees. She gets shrunk.
Firewater Man

Episodes
"Mighty 5 Nations in: Invasion of Turtle Island" in TV guides is actually listed onscreen as "BY THE RAPIDS PRESENTS THE MIGHTY 5 NATIONS IN INVASION AT TURTLE ISLAND".

Season 1

Season 2

Season 3
APTN hosts this.

References

External links 
 By the Rapids APTN site.
 

2008 Canadian television series debuts
2012 Canadian television series endings
2000s Canadian adult animated television series
2010s Canadian adult animated television series
Canadian adult animated comedy television series
Aboriginal Peoples Television Network original programming
Mohawk culture
Animated television series about dysfunctional families
Television shows set in Canada
First Nations television series